Erwann Binet (born 30 July 1972) is a French politician. 

Binet was born in Brest, Finistère. He was first elected to the National Assembly in the 2012 election, and served as the deputy for the eighth circonscription of Isère on the Socialist Party ticket, succeeding Jacques Remiller to the post. He was appointed rapporteur for the Law Commission for the passage of Bill 344.  He lost the 2017 election to 
Caroline Abadie of REM.

References

External links
 Profile on National Assembly website
 Biography on campaign website

1972 births
Living people
Politicians from Brest, France
Socialist Party (France) politicians
Deputies of the 14th National Assembly of the French Fifth Republic
French LGBT rights activists